Richard Rochefort (born January 7, 1977) is a Canadian former professional ice hockey player who played for Nikkō Ice Bucks of the Asia League Ice Hockey (ALIH). He was selected by the New Jersey Devils in the 7th round (174th overall) of the 1995 NHL Entry Draft.

Rochefort was a nominee for the 2001–02 Fred T. Hunt Memorial Award for the American Hockey League player demonstrating dedication, determination, and sportsmanship.

Career statistics

References

External links

1977 births
Albany River Rats players
HC Ambrì-Piotta players
Ässät players
Augsburger Panther players
Canadian ice hockey centres
SHC Fassa players
Herning Blue Fox players
Ice hockey people from Ontario
Iserlohn Roosters players
Lausitzer Füchse players
Living people
New Jersey Devils draft picks
Nikkō Ice Bucks players
Ritten Sport players
Sportspeople from North Bay, Ontario
Sarnia Sting players
Sudbury Wolves players
Canadian expatriate ice hockey players in Germany
Canadian ice hockey defencemen